Juan de Acuña y Bejarano, 1st Marquess of Casa Fuerte (February 22, 1658 – March 17, 1734) was a Spanish military officer and viceroy of New Spain.

Background
Juan de Acuña was the second Criollo (meaning that he was Spanish but born in the New World) to govern in New Spain. He was born in Lima in 1658, the son of Juan de Acuña and of Margarita Bejarano. At a young age joined the military. He distinguished himself in the service, holding many important positions. He began as a captain of infantry and advanced to general of artillery. He was governor of Messina, Sicily. He was made knight of the military Order of Santiago. He was military commander of the kingdoms of Aragon and Mallorca when he was named viceroy, captain general and president of the Audiencia of New Spain.

As viceroy
He made his solemn entry into Mexico City and took up his positions on October 15, 1722. He was well liked by the people of New Spain, not only because he was a criollo, but also because he chose his officials with more regard for their abilities than for their influence.

He found a nearly empty treasury and a great public debt, and it was necessary that he pay special attention to the finances of the colony. He was able to augment the rents due the treasury by about one million pesos annually, to eight million pesos a year.

He pacified completely the region of Nayar, sending an armed expedition there under Juan Flores de San Pedro and establishing colonies. He also established a cannon foundry in Orizaba (Veracruz) to arm the ports and the coast guard. He improved the drainage in the mines in Pachuca (Hidalgo), allowing more veins of ore to be worked.

The English were again exploiting the precious woods of the region, in Yucatan and Belize. A Spanish privateer seized an English sloop and frigate carrying logwood off Cape Catoche, Yucatan (now in Quintana Roo). Acuña y Manrique sent an armed expedition consisting of two pirogues of war, one galleon and 300 men to dislodge the English. However, upon arrival the Spanish discovered that the English were numerous and well armed, with 800 men and large warships. The Spanish expedition was not successful. Parallel diplomatic negotiations also came to nothing. The viceroy let the matter drop, preferring to concentrate on things over which he had control. These included the garrisons at San Juan de Ulúa, Isla del Carmen, Veracruz, and the bays of Espíritu Santo and Pensacola.

In 1728 he authorized Juan Francisco Sahugún de Arévalo to restart the newspaper La Gaceta de México, which had been suspended in 1722. In 1730 he directed that all the silversmiths move to a central location, San Francisco Street, now calle de Francisco I. Madero. In 1731 he ordered the construction of the customshouse, with all its warehouses, and the rebuilding of the mint. The latter institution already was known around the world for the quality of its work. In 1730 the mint produced more than ten million pesos of silver and 151,560 of gold, conforming to rigorous standards of weight and form.

As a consequence of his honesty and good government, in 1727 his term of office was extended for three years. In March 1731, sixteen families (56 people) from the Canary Islands, often referred to as the "Canary Islanders," arrived at the Presidio San Antonio de Béxar in the Province of Texas. By royal decree of King Philip V of Spain, they founded La Villa de San Fernando by the San Antonio River and established the first civil government in Texas. The Viceroy of New Spain, the Marquess of Casa Fuerte, bestowed upon each Canary Island family titles of nobility. Many descendants of these first settlers still reside in San Antonio.

He placed strong limits on the actions of the Inquisition, which he accused of irregular and unjust proceedings.

In response to a petition from the viceroy, the pope ordered the construction of the Colegiata de Nuestra Señora de Guadalupe. In 1730 the archbishop, in the presence of the viceroy, inaugurated the great screen of the choir at the cathedral. It had been fabricated in Macau and brought to New Spain by the galleon from China.

Juan de Acuña y Manrique died in the capital of the colony on March 17, 1734. He was interred in the church of San Cosme y San Damián.

Arms

References
 García Puron, Manuel, México y sus gobernantes, v. 1. Mexico City: Joaquín Porrua, 1984.
 Orozco Linares, Fernando, Gobernantes de México. Mexico City: Panorama Editorial, 1985, .

1658 births
1734 deaths
People from Lima
Viceroys of New Spain
Marquesses of Spain
Knights of Santiago
Spanish generals
Peruvian people of Spanish descent